Naomi Wyatt is a former Secretary of the Pennsylvania Office of Administration who served from 2007 to 2010. She is the chief of staff for the School District of Philadelphia superintendent William R. Hite, Jr.

References

Living people
State cabinet secretaries of Pennsylvania
Women in Pennsylvania politics
Year of birth missing (living people)
Place of birth missing (living people)
21st-century American women